Konda Surekha (born 19 August 1965) is an Indian politician from the Indian National Congress. She served as an MLA from Shyampet, Parkal, and Warangal East constituencies in Telangana.

Early life
Konda Surekha was born in the city of Warangal, India to Thumma Chandramouli and Thumma Radha and married to Konda Murali.

Career
Konda Surekha was elected as Mandal Parishad, in 1995.  In 1996 she was appointed PCC member and in 1999 was elected as M.L.A. from Shayampet. In 1999 she became a Congress Legislature Party Treasurer, as well as being a member of Women & Child Welfare Committee, Health and Primary Education Standing committee.  She was appointed AICC Member in 2000.

In 2004 she got elected as MLA –Shayampet and in 2004 was an official spokesperson for Congress party. She became Ex Officio Member, Municipal corporation, in 2005.  In 2009 she got elected as Parkal MLA and was sworn in as Minister for Women Development & Child Welfare, Disabled & Juvenile Welfare.

She served as Minister for Women Development & Child Welfare, Disabled & Juvenile Welfare under Y. S. Rajasekhara Reddy, but resigned after YSR's death when his son Y. S. Jaganmohan Reddy was not made Chief Minister, even though he has majority of MLAs support.

She resigned on 4 July 2011, her MLA seat for Jagan cause and later for YSR's name mentioned in FIR.
She contested by-polls held on 12 June 2012 from Parkal assembly constituency as YSR Congress Party candidate.

She resigned from YSRC party in July 2013 citing ill-treatment from the Jagan Mohan Reddy Party people. Days before Indian general elections 2014 she joined Telangana Rashtra Samithi party and contested from Warangal-East Assembly constituency. She won as an MLA from Warangal East (Assembly constituency) with a 55,085 votes majority.

In 2018 she quit TRS party along with her husband and joined the INC.

Political statistics

Personal life
Konda Surekha is married to Konda Murali, an ex-MLC and a Congress leader from Warangal district. They have one daughter.

References

1965 births
Living people
Indian National Congress politicians from Telangana
Telangana Rashtra Samithi politicians
People from Warangal
Women members of the Telangana Legislative Assembly
Andhra Pradesh MLAs 2004–2009
Andhra Pradesh MLAs 2009–2014
Telangana MLAs 2014–2018
21st-century Indian women politicians
20th-century Indian women politicians
Women members of the Andhra Pradesh Legislative Assembly
Andhra Pradesh MLAs 1999–2004
YSR Congress Party politicians